Nyata is an island in the Barat Daya Islands in the Banda Sea. It is northwest of Romang, in the Banda Sea.

References

Barat Daya Islands
Islands of the Maluku Islands